Unthank is a former village near Constable Burton in North Yorkshire, England. The village survived until some time in the 19th century.  The site is currently that of Unthank Farm, a mail-order foods business.

See also
Unthank, Stanhope

References

Former populated places in North Yorkshire